The Mermaid of Black Conch is the sixth novel by Monique Roffey, published in 2020.

Development 
Roffey first conceived of the novel's mermaid during a 2013 trip to Charlotteville, Tobago.

In 2019, Roffey launched a Crowdfunder campaign to fund a publicity campaign for the novel. The novel was first published on 2 April 2020 by Peepal Tree Press. The rights were later acquired by Vintage Publishing.

Reception 
The Mermaid of Black Conch won the 2020 Costa Book of the Year award. The novel was shortlisted for the 2020 Goldsmiths Prize, and longlisted for the 2021 Orwell Prize for Political Fiction.

References 

2020 British novels
English-language novels
Fiction about mermaids
Costa Book Award-winning works
Fiction set in 1976
Peepal Tree Press books